Erik Enger (10 April 1927 – 15 June 2016) was a Norwegian physician.

Enger was born in Oslo. He was professor of internal medicine at the University of Oslo, and worked as a physician at Ullevål Hospital from 1973 to 1995. He chaired the ethical council of the Norwegian Medical Association from 1974 to 1985, and contributed to the public debate on medical ethics and jurisprudence.

References

1927 births
2016 deaths
Norwegian internists
Academic staff of the University of Oslo
Oslo University Hospital people